Bandargah may refer to:
 Bandargah, Bushehr
 Bandargah, Zanjan